"And Then What" is the debut single written and performed by American rapper Young Jeezy. It was released in mid-2005 as the first single from his debut album Let's Get It: Thug Motivation 101. It was produced by and features Mannie Fresh. The official music video features cameo appearances by Fabolous, Bun B, Lil Scrappy, 2 Chainz and Dr. Dre.

Charts

Weekly charts

Year-end charts

References

2005 debut singles
Music videos directed by Jessy Terrero
Song recordings produced by Mannie Fresh
Jeezy songs
2005 songs
Def Jam Recordings singles
Gangsta rap songs
Songs written by Jeezy
Songs written by Mannie Fresh